The 2022–23 Muktijoddha Sangsad KC's season is the 42nd competitive highest level season. This season will remarks 15th existence season overall in Bangladesh football. In addition to domestic league, the club will participate on this season's edition of Federation Cup and Independence Cup. The season are covering period from 8 October 2022– TBC 2023.

Current squad
Muktijoddha Sangsad KC squad for 2022-23 season.

Pre-season friendly

Transfer

In

Out

Competitions

Overall

Overview

Premier League

League table

Results summary

Results by round

Matches

Federation Cup

Group stage

Independence Cup

Group stages

Knockout stages

Statistics

Goalscorers

Source: Matches

References

Muktijoddha Sangsad KC
2022 in Bangladeshi football
2023 in Bangladeshi football
Bangladeshi football club records and statistics